Tomáš Čvančara (born 13 August 2000) is a Czech professional footballer who plays as a forward for Sparta Prague.

Career
Before the second half of 2018–19, Čvančara was sent on loan to the youth academy of Italian Serie A side Empoli from Jablonec in the Czech top flight.

In 2019, he was sent on loan to Czech second division club Slavoj Vyšehrad.

Career statistics

Club

References

External links
 
 

Living people
2000 births
Czech footballers
Czech expatriate footballers
Association football forwards
SK Slavia Prague players
Empoli F.C. players
FK Jablonec players
SFC Opava players
FC Slavoj Vyšehrad players 
Czech National Football League players
Czech First League players
Expatriate footballers in Italy
Czech expatriate sportspeople in Italy
AC Sparta Prague players